Albion Park White Eagles is a mainly Serbian Australian-backed football club based in the suburb of Albion Park, a suburb of Wollongong, New South Wales.

History 
Established in 2000, the White Eagles amalgamated with Albion Park Soccer Club (which was formed in 1975) to form the Albion Park White Eagles as it is known today.

Notable players 
  Ballamodou Conde – 17 international caps
  Shohei Okuno – 2016 George Naylor Medalist

Honours 
 Illawarra Premier League Grand Final Winners
 1998(Wollongong White Eagles), 2007, 2008, 2016
 Illawarra Premier League Premiers
 2008
 Ilawarra First Division Grand Final
 2001, 2002
 Illawarra First Division Premiers
 2002
 Illawarra Premier League Reserve Grade Grand Final Winners
 2003
 Illawarra Premier League Youth Grade Premiers
 2005
 Karadjordje Cup Winners
 2005

References

External links 
 Official Club Website

Serbian sports clubs in Australia
Soccer clubs in Wollongong
Illawarra Premier League
Association football clubs established in 1983
1983 establishments in Australia